Farragon Hill (782 m) is a peak in the foothills of the Grampian Mountains of Scotland. It lies above the town of Aberfeldy in Perthshire.

The hill is the highest point in the area of rough moorland that lies between Aberfeldy and Loch Tummel.

References

Mountains and hills of Perth and Kinross
Marilyns of Scotland
Corbetts